Franz Espagne (21 April 1828 – 24 May 1878) was a German musicologist and librarian.

Life 
Born in Münster, Espagne was student of the 19th-century musicologist Siegfried Dehn in Berlin. In 1858 he was music director in Bielefeld for a short time. In the same year, after the untimely death of Dehn, he took over the management of the music department of the Königliche Bibliothek in Berlin. He held this office until his death. His successor was Albert Kopfermann.

He was also the choirmaster at the St. Hedwig's Cathedral of the city. He also made a name for himself as a collaborator on the complete editions of Beethoven and Palestrina, which were published by Leipziger Verlag Breitkopf & Härtel.

Espagne died in Berlin at age 50.

Publications 
 Verzeichnis sämmtlicher Werke Dr. Carl Loewe's, Berlin 1870

Further reading 
 Hugo Riemann's Musik-Lexikon, 10th edition, edited by Alfred Einstein, Berlin 1922,

References

External links 
 Espagne, Franz on WorldCat.

Musicologists from Berlin
19th-century German musicologists
German librarians
1828 births
1878 deaths
People from Münster